The Urgonian Limestone is a geologic formation in France. It preserves fossils dating back to the Cretaceous period. Some parts of the limestone have undergone metamorphism to produce ductile folds next to faults.

See also 

 List of fossiliferous stratigraphic units in France

References

External links 
 

Geologic formations of France
Jurassic France
Limestone formations